Roger Townshend may refer to:

Sir Roger Townshend (judge) (c. 1430–1493), English landowner, Judge of the Court of Common Pleas, MP for Bramber
Sir Roger Townshend (Norfolk MP, born 1477) (1477–1552), English landowner, MP for Norfolk, son of the above
Sir Roger Townshend (courtier, died 1590) (c. 1544–1590), English landowner, courtier and soldier, great-grandson of the above
Sir Roger Townshend, 1st Baronet (c. 1596–1637), English landowner, MP for Orford and Norfolk, grandson of the above
Sir Roger Townshend, 2nd Baronet (1628–1648), English landowner, eldest son of the above
Roger Townshend (Norfolk MP, died 1709), English soldier, MP for Norfolk and Great Yarmouth, nephew of the above
Roger Townshend (British Army officer, born 1708) (1708–1760), English soldier, MP for Great Yarmouth and Eye, nephew of the above